The Evil Below is a 1989 horror film about an adventurer who goes hunting for treasure on a cursed shipwreck. Starring actors included Paul Siebert and June Chadwick. It is one of many underwater-themed movies released around 1989, including The Abyss, Leviathan, DeepStar Six, Lords of the Deep, and The Rift (Endless Descent).

Plot

Max Cash is a down-on-his luck fisherman and charter boat captain living in the Bahamas when his life takes a turn when he meets Sarah Livingstone, a tourist who is seeking to find the treasure of accursed shipwreck, 'The El Diablo' which has been rumored to have sunk on an offshore reef near one of the many islands. Max and Sarah then team up to locate the wreck while dodging a local crime boss as well as a mysterious businessman who claims that the wreck is guarded by supernatural forces in form of a sea monster that no one claims to have ever seen and survived.

Cast
Wayne Crawford as Max Cash
June Chadwick as Sarah Livingstone
Sheri Able as Tracy
Ted Le Plat as Adrian Barlow
Graham Clarke as Ray Calhoun
Liam Cundill as Ray Calhoun Junior
Gordon Mulholland as Max Cash Senior
Brian O'Shaughnessy as Father Shannon
Peter Terry as Constable Chambers
Paul Siebert as Guido

Reception

Creature Feature gave the movie two out of five stars.

References

External links
 

1989 films
1980s adventure films
1989 horror films
American adventure films
American supernatural horror films
Treasure hunt films
Underwater action films
Films set in the Bahamas
1980s English-language films
1980s American films